Partridge Jewellers Ltd, trading as Partridge Jewellers is a luxury jewellery manufacturer and retailer operating in New Zealand.

Founded in Wellington, New Zealand in 1877, and involving six generations of Partridges, the company currently has outlets on Lambton Quay in Wellington; Auckland on both Queen Street, and on Broadway in Newmarket; Queenstown; and most recently Christchurch. The Queenstown store opened in late 2012, with the original Wellington store undergoing renovations in early 2013. In October 2013 the company opened its fifth store in the upper level of the Westfield Riccarton shopping centre in Christchurch. In 2016 the company opened its sixth store in the heart of Christchurch City in the new ANZ Centre on Cashel Street and a seventh showroom at Auckland international airport in July 2018.

Gallery

References

External links

 

Jewellery retailers of New Zealand
Companies based in Wellington
Retail companies established in 1877
New Zealand brands
Luxury brands
New Zealand companies established in 1877